The following have been masters of Clare College, Cambridge:

References

Masters
Clare